Gymnocalycium eurypleurum is a small "chin cactus" that is highly prized by cactus collectors and is known to be fairly easy to grow, albeit very slow  It has been cultivated outside in latitudes as far north as Modesto, California. In the wild, the species is almost always solitary (non-clumping) and may grow in association with Frailea species. The species when grown in the greenhouse is also known for its fidelity to wild specimens.
Gymnocalycium eurypleurum is an endemic specie from  Paraguay.

Range
Friedrich Ritter describes the range of the species as, "even more vast than generally known. We found G. eurypleurum until close to the military station of Fn. Palmar de las Islas, up in the north near the Bolivian border. Here the species coexisted together with the beautiful Echinopsis chacoana, Gymnocalycium mihanovichii var. stenopleurum and Frailea spec."

References

eurypleurum
Cacti of South America
Flora of Argentina
Plants described in 1979